Maree Montgomery is an Australian jazz singer. She was nominated for 1987 ARIA Award for Best Jazz Album with her album Woman Of Mystery.

Discography

Albums

Awards and nominations

ARIA Music Awards
The ARIA Music Awards is an annual awards ceremony that recognises excellence, innovation, and achievement across all genres of Australian music. They commenced in 1987. 

! 
|-
| 1987
| Woman of Mystery
| Best Jazz Album
| 
|

References

External links
Maree Montgomery | Recording Artist | Entertainer
Biographical cuttings on Maree Montgomery, jazz singer, containing one or more cuttings from newspapers or journals - Trove, National Library of Australia

Australian musicians
Living people
Year of birth missing (living people)